John L. Bohn (1869 – April 20, 1955) was an American politician who served as mayor of Milwaukee, Wisconsin, from 1942 to 1948.

Early life 
John Louis Bohn, the son of German Lutheran immigrants, was born 1869 in Two Rivers, Wisconsin.

Career 
Bohn was in the hotel and restaurant business in Michigan and Wisconsin. He served on the Milwaukee County Board of Supervisors from 1898 to 1902. In 1916, Bohn was elected to the Milwaukee Common Council. He was president of the council when Mayor Carl Zeidler resigned in 1942 to serve in the U.S. Navy. Bohn became acting mayor after Zeidler's resignation. In 1944 Bohn was elected to a full mayoral term. In 1948, he was succeeded by Frank Zeidler, Carl Zeidler's brother.

Personal 
On April 20, 1955, Bohn died from heart failure in Milwaukee, Wisconsin.

References

External links 
 

1867 births
1955 deaths
People from Two Rivers, Wisconsin
American people of German descent
Businesspeople from Wisconsin
Mayors of Milwaukee
Milwaukee Common Council members
County supervisors in Wisconsin
20th-century American politicians